The 2022–23 season is Raith Rovers' third season back in the second tier of Scottish football after being promoted from Scottish League One at the end of the 2019–20 season. Raith Rovers will also compete in the League Cup, Challenge Cup & the Scottish Cup.

Summary

Management
Raith will be led by manager Ian Murray. The 2022–23 season is his first season at the club.

Results & fixtures

Friendlies

Scottish Championship

Scottish League Cup

Scottish Challenge Cup

Scottish Cup

Player statistics

Squad 
Last updated 18 March 2023

|}

Disciplinary record
Includes all competitive matches.

Last updated March 2023

Team statistics

League table

League Cup table

Management statistics
Last updated on 18 March 2023

Notes

References

Raith Rovers F.C. seasons
Raith Rovers